Fury Road (2019) was a supercard event produced by Major League Wrestling (MLW), which took place on June 1, 2019 at the Waukesha County Expo Center in Waukesha, Wisconsin. The event aired as a live special episode of MLW's television program, Fusion, on beIN Sports. It was the second event under the Fury Road chronology. 

Fifteen matches were contested on the card, with three matches airing live while the other matches being taped for future episodes of Fusion. On the live broadcast of Fury Road, Teddy Hart successfully defended the World Middleweight Championship against Jimmy Havoc in the main event. On the undercard, Alexander Hammerstone defeated Brian Pillman Jr. in the finals of a four-man tournament to become the inaugural National Openweight Champion and Gringo Loco defeated Myron Reed in a middleweight match.

Production

Background
On February 25, 2019, MLW.com announced that Major League Wrestling would be holding its first-ever event in Wisconsin on June 1. It was announced that Fury Road would take place at the Waukesha County Expo Center in Waukesha, Wisconsin. MLW previously held an event Fury Road as a television taping for Fusion in 2018. However, on May 14, MLW announced that the 2019 edition of Fury Road would be a live television special to be aired on beIN Sports.

Storylines

The card consisted of matches that resulted from scripted storylines, where wrestlers portrayed villains, heroes, or less distinguishable characters in scripted events that built tension and culminated in a wrestling match or series of matches, with results predetermined by MLW's writers. Storylines were played out on MLW's television program Fusion.

On April 18, 2019, MLW.com announced that MLW was introducing a new title called the National Openweight Championship. It was announced that a four-man tournament would take place to determine the inaugural champion and the tournament final would take place at Fury Road. Alexander Hammerstone defeated Gringo Loco in the first semi-final on the May 11 episode of Fusion and Brian Pillman Jr. defeated Rich Swann in the second semi-final on the May 18 episode of Fusion, thus setting up the tournament final between Pillman and Hammerstone to crown the inaugural champion at Fury Road, which would also continue the ongoing feud between The Hart Foundation and The Dynasty, Pillman and Hammerstone's respective stables.

On May 13, it was announced that Teddy Hart would defend the World Middleweight Championship against Jimmy Havoc at Fury Road.

On May 20, it was announced that Rey Horus would take on Myron Reed in a middleweight match at Fury Road.

Event

Preliminary matches
The event opened with a middleweight match between Gringo Loco and Myron Reed. Reed grabbed the ropes for leverage to pin Loco but the referee stopped the pinfall count due to illegal activity which led to Reed arguing with the referee. The distraction allowed Loco to hit a kneeling reverse piledriver to Reed for the win. Reed then hit Loco with brass knuckles after the match.

Next, the tournament final to crown the inaugural National Openweight Champion took place between Brian Pillman Jr. and Alexander Hammerstone. Hammerstone moved out of the way of a diving splash by Pillman and nailed a Nightmare Pendulum for the win thus becoming the first-ever National Openweight Champion.

After the match, Contra Unit attacked the World Heavyweight Champion Tom Lawlor in the parking lot and kidnapped him and then cut off his hair.

Main event match
In the main event, Teddy Hart defended the World Middleweight Championship against Jimmy Havoc. Hart avoided an Acid Rainmaker by Havoc and nailed a Canadian Destroyer to Havoc which was followed by a hammerlock DDT for the win to retain the title. After the match, The Dynasty attacked Hart but Hart Foundation made the save.

Results

Tournament brackets

References

External links
Fury Road 2019 official website

Major League Wrestling shows
2019 in professional wrestling
2019 American television episodes
2010s American television specials
June 2019 events in the United States
2019 in Wisconsin
Professional wrestling in Wisconsin
Events in Wisconsin